Kantemir Arturovich Balagov (born 28 July 1991) is a Russian film director of Circassian descent, screenwriter and cinematographer from the Republic of Kabardino-Balkaria, in the North Caucasian region of the Russian Federation. He has directed the films Closeness (2017) and Beanpole (2019).

Biography
Balagov was born in Nalchik, Kabardino-Balkarian Autonomous Soviet Socialist Republic, RSFSR, in the final year of the Soviet Union, into a family with no connection to cinema. His mother is chemistry and biology teacher who works as the head teacher at a local school, while his father is a local entrepreneur.

Since childhood, Balagov had been watching mainstream movies, and at the age of 18 began to create his own small videos. Then, together with friends in Nalchik, he shot an Internet series with episodes of 10 minutes each. He did not originally plan to pursue a career as a filmmaker, but decided to apply for the cinema workshop led by Alexander Sokurov at Kabardino-Balkarian State University in Nalchik. Balagov missed the deadline to enter the university as a freshman, but he still wrote to Sokurov asking Sokurov to consider his application. He eventually was accepted to the workshop as a third-year student. He graduated from university after studies in Sokurov's workshop. Directors Kira Kovalenko, Alexander Zolotukhin and Vladimir Bitokov were his fellow students.

During his studies, he made several fiction and documentary films. Some of Balagov's short films were shown at the 67th Locarno Festival. In 2017, he made his debut as a director with the feature film Closeness in the program Un Certain Regard at the Cannes Film Festival, where he received the prize FIPRESCI. In 2017, he was awarded the GQ Russia Prize in the category Discovery of the Year.

In 2019, Balagov received the Cannes Film Festival Award for Best Director and FIPRESCI prize for the film Beanpole, which was likewise presented in the program Un Certain Regard. Beanpole was Russia's entry for Best International Feature Film at the 92nd Academy Awards, making the December shortlist.

In January 2021, Balagov was named as the director of the pilot for The Last of Us television adaptation. In October 2022, Balagov announced that he left the project a year ago over creative differences, and the series' showrunner and creator, Craig Mazin, took over directing duties for the pilot, although 40% of the footage shot by Balagov were retained in the final cut.

When Russia invaded Ukraine on February 24, 2022, Balagov condemned the war and left Russia. Balagov and his girlfriend, another Russian director Kira Kovalenko were chosen as Telluride Film Festival guest directors in September 2022.

References

External links
 
 Балагову 27, а он снова на Каннском фестивале

1991 births
Living people
People from Nalchik
Circassian people of Russia
Russian cinematographers
Russian film directors
Russian screenwriters
Russian activists against the 2022 Russian invasion of Ukraine